Alexander Falls is a waterfall on Madeley Creek, a tributary of Callaghan Creek in the Callaghan Valley area of the Sea to Sky Country of southwestern British Columbia, Canada.  The falls are located just below a bridge on the access road to Callaghan Lake Provincial Park, at the head of the valley, which lies to the west of the resort town of Whistler.

See also
Callaghan Country
Ski Callaghan
Whistler Olympic Park.
Snowshoe route to Alexander Falls

References

Waterfalls of British Columbia
Sea-to-Sky Corridor
New Westminster Land District